Lisa Andersson  (born 2 August 1997) is a Swedish freestyle skier.
 
She competed in the ski cross event during the 2018 Winter Olympics.

References

External links

1997 births
Living people
Swedish female freestyle skiers 
Olympic freestyle skiers of Sweden 
Freestyle skiers at the 2018 Winter Olympics 
21st-century Swedish women